Quang Trung Software City, also known as Quang Trung Software City, is a business park in District 12 of Ho Chi Minh City, approximately  from District 1. The park focuses on the computer software industry, hosting a number of software companies and schools such as the Saigon Institute of Technology. Established by government decree in June 2000, it officially began operations on 16 March 2001. The initial idea for the park was the brainchild of Nguyễn Thiện Nhân, the Minister of Education, and the design of the park was funded with a grant from the US Trade and Development Agency (USTDA) through the efforts of Pacifica Solutions, LLC, a US-based technology company. The facility was designed through a collaboration of the HCMC Educational Committee, Pacifica Solutions and IndoChina Capital, with assistance from the then-current US Ambassador, Pete Peterson.

Notes and references

External links
 Quang Trung Software City
Business parks
Economy of Ho Chi Minh City